The Arakan Rohingya National Organisation (ARNO) is a Rohingya political organisation based in London, United Kingdom.

Ideology 
The proclaimed beliefs and objectives of ARNO are as follows:
 The right of self-determination of the Rohingya people must be given within a Burmese federation
 Rohingya history and cultural heritage must be preserved without prejudice towards the growth and preservation of other religious and indigenous culture in Arakan (Rakhine)
 The continued religious persecution of Rohingya Muslims by the Burmese military must be stopped
 Rohingya refugees must be repatriated from refugee camps to their villages
 Human resource development, particularly in socio-cultural, economic, educational and technical fields, must be established
 A welfare society based on equality, liberty, democracy, human rights and freedom for all ethnic groups in Burma (Myanmar)
 "Peaceful co-existence" with the Rakhine community and among all other peoples in Arakan as well as in the whole country
 Support for the Burmese opposition and democratic groups
 Support for the landmine ban treaty 
 Support for the rights of Rohingya women and girls to education, health and economic empowerment
 Support for educating the youth about the dangers of drugs and disease (i.e. AIDS)
 Protection of the environment, including forests, rivers, wetlands, coastline ocean
 Unsustainable logging, killing of endangered species, all forms of pollution, and over fishing must be stopped
 Support for a future sustainable, appropriate, clean, and beneficial development to the common people

ARNO works with other Rohingya groups and Burmese groups both in Burma and abroad. It also works with the British Foreign and Common Wealth Office and the Parliamentary Committee on Burma. The group also maintains close ties with Amnesty International, Asia Watch, Burma Campaign U.K and many other human rights and humanitarian organisations in Europe, the United States and Asia. ARNO also supports the Burmese democracy movement, ethnic nationalities forums and support groups. In addition, ARNO is actively working together with the Euro-Burma Office in Brussels, Belgium, and the National Reconciliation Programme (NRP) of the Union of Burma. ARNO also carries out various socio-cultural, economic and education uplift programmes and human resource development among the Rohingya people.

ARNO has condemned terrorism, denouncing terrorism of all kinds everywhere in the world. The group supports their statement by highlighting the fact that none of their allies or members are on a terror list.

See also 
 Rohingya National Council

References

External links 
 

Rebel groups in Myanmar
Islam in Myanmar
Rakhine State
Rebellions in Asia
Insurgency